Paul Hunter (born January 18, 1956) is a Canadian-born retired soccer player. He played for the University of Connecticut Huskies and spent five seasons in the North American Soccer League. His position was defender.

High school and college
While born in Canada, Hunter and his brother Tim grew up in Westport, Connecticut where he attended Staples High School.  Staples won the 1971 Connecticut state championship Hunter's junior.   While the team repeated as champions in 1972, Hunter shattered his leg mid-season, putting him out for the rest of the year.  He then attended the University of Connecticut, playing on the men's soccer team from 1974 to 1976.  He was selected as an honourable mention (third team) All American in 1975 and a first team All American his senior season.  He was also team captain that season.

Professional
Hunter signed with the New York Cosmos of the North American Soccer League (NASL) in 1977.  He played only three games and transferred to the Detroit Express where he became a regular starter for two seasons.  In 1980, he played only five games for the Express and in 1981, found himself with the Tulsa Roughnecks where he played twenty games. He also played NASL indoor during the 1979–80 and 1980–81 seasons.

Hunter was inducted into the Connecticut Soccer Hall of Fame in 2004.

References

External links
 NASL stats

1956 births
Soccer players from Toronto
Canadian soccer players
Canadian emigrants to the United States
Detroit Express players
Association football defenders
North American Soccer League (1968–1984) indoor players
New York Cosmos players
North American Soccer League (1968–1984) players
Sportspeople from Stamford, Connecticut
Soccer players from Connecticut
Tulsa Roughnecks (1978–1984) players
UConn Huskies men's soccer players
Living people
All-American men's college soccer players
Staples High School alumni